The American Academy of Periodontology Foundation is a non-profit, charitable foundation that promotes public awareness of periodontal disease, provides funding for research fellowships to produce new knowledge related to periodontal health, and provides educational grants to periodontists in training. The AAP Foundation was established in 1990 in Chicago, Illinois. The foundation issues $400,000 in support annually, and has awarded $3.7 million in grants, fellowships, and scholarships.

The mission statement of the foundation is "to improve the periodontal and general health of the public through increasing public and professional knowledge of periodontal diseases and their therapies, stimulating basic and clinical research to generate new knowledge, and enhancing educational programs at all levels to create opportunities in periodontal education and practice."

Board Members and Directors

OFFICERS

President: John H. Kobs
Vice-President: Vanchit John 
Secretary-Treasurer: Vincent J. Iacono
Immediate Past President: Ronald Tarrson

DIRECTORS

John M. Forbes
Stuart J. Froum
Maria L. Geisinger
Joan Otomo-Corgel 
Jody Rodney 
Christopher Richardson
Myron Nevins
Nancy L. Newhouse
Fotinos S. Panagakos
Terry D. Rees, ABP Representative
S. Timothy Rose

Executive Directors
 Robert A. Vitas 2010–Present
 Mary Beth Whalen 1990-1999
 Sharon Mellor 1999-2009

References

Related Pages
 American Academy of Periodontology

1990 establishments in Illinois
Organizations established in 1990
Periodontology